Heinrich VIII may refer to:

 Heinrich von Bibra (1711-1788), Prince-Bishop, Prince-Abbot of Fulda

See also
 Henry VIII (disambiguation)